Mynonoma is a genus of beetles in the family Cerambycidae, containing the following species:

 Mynonoma eunidioides Pascoe, 1865
 Mynonoma integricollis (Breuning, 1942)

References

Apomecynini